Group B of the UEFA Women's Euro 2013 consisted of Germany, the reigning champions, Iceland, Netherlands and Norway. Matches were staged in Kalmar and Växjö from 11–17 July 2013.

Norway won the group and advanced to the knockout stage along with group runners-up Germany. Iceland progressed as one of the best third-placed teams while the Netherlands failed to advance.

Standings

Norway vs Iceland

Germany vs Netherlands

Norway vs Netherlands

Iceland vs Germany

Germany vs Norway

Netherlands vs Iceland

References

External links
Group B at UEFA's official website

Group B
Group
Group
2013 in Icelandic football
Group